Brewster's Rooster is an album by English saxophonist John Surman with guitarist John Abercrombie, drummer Jack DeJohnette, and bassist Drew Gress recorded in 2007 and released on the ECM label.

Reception
The Allmusic review by Thom Jurek awarded the album 4 stars, stating, "Brewster's Rooster is another high point in Surman's career. This studio band is as sympathetic as his working road unit, and his willingness to place the tradition in the context of his more contemporary, sometimes ambiguous harmonic explorations reveals the roots, shoots, and branches of his art and discipline".

Track listing
All compositions by John Surman except as indicated
 "Slanted Sky" (John Warren) - 6:33   
 "Hilltop Dancer" - 7:26   
 "No Finesse" - 6:51   
 "Kickback" - 7:24   
 "Chelsea Bridge" (Billy Strayhorn) - 5:48   
 "Haywain" - 6:18   
 "Counter Measures" - 10:43   
 "Brewster's Rooster" - 6:36   
 "Going for a Burton" - 6:47  
Recorded at Avatar Studios in New York City in September 2007.

Personnel
John Surman – soprano saxophone, baritone saxophone
John Abercrombie – guitar
Drew Gress – double bass
Jack DeJohnette – drums

References

ECM Records albums
John Surman albums
2008 albums
Albums produced by Manfred Eicher